Luseland Airport  is located adjacent to Luseland, Saskatchewan, Canada. This a general aviation airport with no landing fees. It offers one asphalt runway with night landing lights.

Gallery

See also 
 List of airports in Saskatchewan

References 

Registered aerodromes in Saskatchewan
Progress No. 351, Saskatchewan